The Dark Hour may refer to:

The Dark Hour (1936 film), an American film directed by Charles Lamont
The Dark Hour (2007 film), a Spanish science fiction film written and directed by Elio Quiroga
The Dark Hours, a Canadian horror film directed by Paul Fox

See also 
 Darkest Hour (disambiguation)